Samuel Dickstein (12 May 1851 – 28 September 1939) was a Polish mathematician of Jewish origin. He was one of the founders of the Jewish party Zjednoczenie ("the union"), which advocated the assimilation of Polish Jews.

He was born in Warsaw and was killed there by a German bomb at the beginning of World War II. All the members of his family were murdered during the Holocaust.

Work

Dickstein wrote many mathematical books and founded the journal Wiadomości Mathematyczne (Mathematical News), now published by the Polish Mathematical Society. He was a bridge between the times of Cauchy and Poincaré and those of the Lwów School of Mathematics. He was also thanked by Alexander Macfarlane for contributing to the Bibliography of Quaternions (1904) published by the Quaternion Society.

He was also one of the personalities, who contributed to the foundation of the Warsaw Public Library in 1907.

External links
 Biography of Samuel Dickstein
 

19th-century Polish mathematicians
20th-century Polish mathematicians
19th-century Polish Jews
1851 births
1939 deaths
Academic staff of the University of Warsaw
Scientists from Warsaw
Recipients of the Order of Polonia Restituta
Polish civilians killed in World War II
Deaths by airstrike during World War II
20th-century Polish Jews